Eva Marcille Sterling (née Pigford; born October 30, 1984) is an American actress, fashion model and television personality. She started her career by winning the third cycle of America's Next Top Model.

Early life
Sterling was born in Los Angeles, California as Eva Pigford. Her middle name, Marcille, is an amalgam of her grandmothers' names "Marjorie" and "Lucille". Her parents are both African American. She attended Raymond Avenue Elementary School, Marina Del Rey Middle School, and Washington Preparatory High School (2002). She attended Clark Atlanta University in Atlanta, Georgia; however, she left the school shortly after winning the third season of America's Next Top Model at the age of 19.

Career

Modeling
Marcille was the winner of the third cycle of America's Next Top Model in 2004, beating fellow contestant Yaya DaCosta. Her prizes included a CoverGirl cosmetics contract, a spread in Elle, and a modeling contract with Ford Models.

Marcille has appeared on the cover of Brides Noir, Women's Health and Fitness (May 2005), King (June 2005), IONA (November 2005), and Essence. Her other modeling credits include CoverGirl, DKNY, Samsung, Red by Marc Ecko, Jewel, In Touch Weekly (June 2005), King (November 2005), WeTheUrban, IONA, UNleashed, Star Magazine, Elle, Elle Girl, Apple Bottoms, Lerner Catalog, Avon Campaign 4 and Rolling Out.

Marcille's runway shows include the Marc Bouwer Fall 2005, Elle Girl presents Dare to Be You: Wal-Mart Meets America's Next Top Model 2005, Gharani Strok Fall 2005, Deborah Lindquist Spring 2006, Naqada Spring 2006, 8th Annual 'Models of Perfection' Show 2006, and L.A. Fashion Week's Monarchy Collection Fall 2007.

On November 15, 2006, Marcille left her managers Benny Medina and Tyra Banks. After leaving Banks and Medina for new management, she officially dropped "Pigford" from her name, now going by Eva Marcille (her middle name). She has stated she did this in order to not use her modeling fame to get into acting but earn her acting roles.

Marcille is now signed to L.A. Models. She has been featured on America's Next Top Model: Exposed on the CW. She has also been featured as one of CoverGirl's Top Models in Action.

Television work
Marcille has guest-starred on several series on UPN and The CW Network. Her guest-star credits include two episodes of Kevin Hill, one episode of Smallville, one episode of Everybody Hates Chris, and one episode of The Game as herself. Marcille has also appeared on Tyler Perry's House of Payne.

In addition, Marcille hosted BET J's reality show My Model Looks Better Than Your Model, as well as Rip the Runway on BET. Furthermore, she has appeared in several music videos, including "Baby" by Angie Stone (featuring Betty Wright), 50 Cent's "I Get Money" and Jamie Foxx's "DJ Play a Love Song".

Marcille was cast as a regular on a FOX show called The Wedding Album in 2006, but FOX canceled it before it aired.

In 2005, Marcille appeared in a first-season episode of the MTV improv show Nick Cannon Presents Wild 'N Out. In December 2007, Marcille played a featured role in an episode of Smallville.

In 2008, she joined the cast of The Young and the Restless as a young mother named Tyra Hamilton. After a few months, her character, who was planned to be temporary was made permanent. In 2009, Marcille was nominated for two NAACP Image Award for Outstanding Actress in a Daytime Drama Series for her Y&R role but didn't get the awards. She did however win a Young Hollywood award.

In film, her credits include The Walk, Crossover, and, most recently, I Think I Love My Wife.

She appeared in a June 2009 episode of the BET prank show Played by Fame, where contestants have nightmarish dates with celebrities.

She hosted the first season of the Oxygen reality series Hair Battle Spectacular in 2010.

In August 2013, Marcille appeared in the video clip "J'accélère (I accelerate)" by French rapper Rohff.

On August 5, 2015, Marcille was in the main cast as the role of Tara in the TV One series Born Again Virgin. In February 2016, she was in a reality series titled About the Business.

In August 2017, Marcille competed in the first season of VH1's Scared Famous, which premiered on October 23, 2017. She joined Season 10 of The Real Housewives of Atlanta as a friend of Nene Leakes and was promoted to a full-time cast member in 2018 for season 11. She departed the series after two seasons in 2020.

Personal life
In July 2006, Marcille began dating actor Lance Gross. The couple became engaged on December 24, 2008 and split up in March 2010. She dated rapper Flo Rida from 2010 to 2012. Marcille has a daughter from her previous relationship with Kevin McCall. She and McCall split in spring 2014, with Marcille stating she has custody of their daughter. In August 2019, she revealed that her daughter's last name has been legally changed from McCall to Sterling.

Eva became engaged to Atlanta-based attorney Michael Sterling in December 2017. They married on October 7, 2018. The couple have two sons, born in April 2018 and September 2019. In 2019, she also founded cEVAd, a CBD oil company. The company launched during the birth of her son Maverick.

Filmography

Film

Television

Music Videos

References

External links

 
 
 

American female models
African-American actresses
African-American female models
African-American models
Actresses from Los Angeles
Living people
American television actresses
Clark Atlanta University alumni
America's Next Top Model winners
1984 births
21st-century African-American people
21st-century African-American women
20th-century African-American people
20th-century African-American women